The 2019 WWE Draft was the fourteenth WWE Draft produced by the American professional wrestling promotion WWE between their Raw and SmackDown brands. Returning to its original name (the "WWE Draft") and a traditional draft format, it was the second draft of 2019, following April's Superstar Shake-up. The draft began on the October 11 episode of Friday Night SmackDown (in Paradise, Nevada) and concluded on the October 14 episode of Monday Night Raw (in Denver, Colorado), with SmackDown airing on Fox and Raw on the USA Network. It was the first draft in which the brand's television networks were presented as having an influence over WWE's drafting decisions. 

2019 was the first year in which WWE held two drafts during the same calendar year. This was because of the issues of the Wild Card Rule introduced with April's Superstar Shake-up and also because of SmackDowns move to Fox in October—Raw and SmackDown were both previously on the USA Network. Over 70 wrestlers (both singles competitors and tag teams) from the Raw, SmackDown, NXT, and 205 Live rosters were eligible to be drafted to either Raw or SmackDown, including all Raw and SmackDown champions. Most draft picks were announced on the live broadcasts of SmackDown and Raw, while supplemental picks were announced afterwards via WWE's website. In storyline, wrestlers who were not drafted to either brand became free agents and could sign with the brand of their choosing. The Wild Card Rule also ended with this draft, although a similar but stricter interbrand rule, the Brand-to-Brand Invitation, was implemented in May 2020.

Production

Background
The WWE Draft is an annual process used by the American professional wrestling promotion WWE while a brand extension, or brand split, is in effect. The original brand extension occurred from 2002 to 2011, while the second and current brand split began in 2016. During a brand extension, the company divides its roster into brands where the wrestlers exclusively perform for each brand's respective television show, and the draft is used to refresh the rosters of the brand divisions, typically between the Raw and SmackDown brands. 

In April 2019, WWE held the Superstar Shake-up, which was the promotion's 13th draft which had a nontraditional format in which drafting decisions were made behind the scenes rather than on-screen. Shortly after the Shake-up, WWE Chairman and Chief Executive Officer Vince McMahon introduced the Wild Card Rule, in which up to four wrestlers would be allowed to appear on the opposing brand's show by invitation for one night only with unsanctioned appearances penalized. Following this, however, the Wild Card Rule's stipulations were not enforced; the rules were immediately broken, with numerous wrestlers freely appearing on both shows weekly without any penalties, blurring the lines between the Raw and SmackDown brands. With SmackDowns move to Fox in October and Raw remaining on the USA Network (part of Comcast's NBCUniversal), WWE decided to hold a second draft for 2019 to definitively split the two brands. The draft was announced to occur on the October 11 and 14 episodes of SmackDown and Raw, respectively. Returning to its original name (the "WWE Draft") and a traditional draft format, personalities from Fox and NBCUniversal were scheduled to appear; the first time that television networks were presented as having an influence over WWE's drafting decisions. The Wild Card Rule also ended with this draft.

The picks were presented by personalities associated with Fox Sports and NBCUniversal properties, including Fox MLB analyst Alex Rodriguez, Saturday Night Lives Michael Che and Colin Jost (who both performed in the André the Giant Memorial Battle Royal at WrestleMania 35 earlier in 2019), Mr. Robots Christian Slater, Fox NFL lead commentators Joe Buck and Troy Aikman, Mad Money host Jim Cramer, Fox MLB analysts Kevin Burkhardt and Frank Thomas, Fox NFL Sundays Terry Bradshaw, Howie Long, Michael Strahan, Jimmy Johnson, and Tony Gonzalez, NFL analysts Ronde Barber, Charles Davis, Chris Spielman, and Daryl Johnston, Fox NFL Kickoffs Charissa Thompson, Michael Vick, and Peter Schrager, Big Noon Kickoffs Rob Stone (a former WWE 24/7 Champion), Brady Quinn, Reggie Bush, Matt Leinart, and Urban Meyer, Fox College Football analyst Joel Klatt, Dulé Hill from USA's Psych and Suits, James Roday from Psych, Marcus Lemonis from CNBC's The Profit, Margaret Josephs and Melissa Gorga from Bravo's The Real Housewives of New Jersey, Rodney Harrison and Chris Simms from NBC's Football Night in America, and Rebecca Lowe, Robbie Mustoe, and Kyle Martino from Premier League Live.

2019 draft rules
The rules of the draft were posted on WWE's website on October 10. The list of eligible wrestlers was posted the same day. Over 70 wrestlers from the Raw, SmackDown, NXT, and 205 Live rosters, as well as tag teams, were eligible to be drafted to either Raw or SmackDown, including all Raw and SmackDown champions (although holders of the 24/7 Championship and WWE Women's Tag Team Championship were eligible to be drafted, they could appear on any brand until they lost their respective titles).

The rules of the draft were the following:
Up to 30 picks were allotted on the October 11 SmackDown, while up to 41 picks were allotted on the October 14 Raw.
For every two draft picks for SmackDown, Raw received three picks (due to SmackDown being a two-hour show, while Raw is three hours).
Tag teams counted as one pick unless FOX or USA specifically only wanted a single member from the team as their pick.
Any undrafted wrestlers became free agents and could sign with the brand of their choosing.

Drafting pool
The drafting pool was divided between the broadcasts of both shows, with up to 30 picks allotted on SmackDown and 41 on Raw. Any remaining picks from the respective draft pools were announced on WWE's website. Undrafted wrestlers (those not selected on the shows or announced via WWE.com) immediately became free agents and could sign with the brand of their choosing.

SmackDown (October 11) 
There were four rounds of draft picks during Night 1 of the 2019 draft. WWE's Chief Brand Officer (CBO) Stephanie McMahon announced the draft picks for each round. Representing Raw, Universal Champion Seth Rollins' disqualification win over SmackDown's representative, Roman Reigns, earned Raw the first draft pick of the night.

Night 1 supplementary picks 
Eight additional picks were announced on WWE's website on October 13. Except for Apollo Crews, who was slated to be a part of the Night 2 pool, all wrestlers selected had initially gone undrafted during Night 1.

Raw (October 14) 
There were six rounds of draft picks during Night 2 of the 2019 draft. WWE's CBO Stephanie McMahon again announced the draft picks for each round. Number one Raw draft pick and Raw Women's Champion Becky Lynch defeated SmackDown representative Charlotte Flair, who replaced SmackDown draftee Sasha Banks (who was not medically cleared to compete), to earn Raw the first draft pick of the night.

 1 – Carrillo, Tozawa, and Gable originally went undrafted on Night 1, but were drafted during Night 2.
 2 – Ziggler and Roode were Raw Tag Team Champions going into the event, but they lost the titles to Raw draftees The Viking Raiders prior to being drafted to SmackDown.

Night 2 supplementary picks 
Ten additional picks were announced on WWE The Bump and via WWE's website on October 16. With the exception of Cesaro, who was slated to be a part of the Night 1 pool, all wrestlers selected had initially gone undrafted during Night 2.

Post-draft trades
Following Night 2 on the premiere episode of Backstage on October 15, WWE's Chief Operating Officer (COO) Triple H announced a trade between Raw and SmackDown. Alexa Bliss and Nikki Cross were traded to SmackDown in exchange for future draft pick considerations. Some more trades were made the following year.

Free agents
Several wrestlers were made free agents due to injury, inactivity, or not being drafted during their draft pool. The chart is organized by date.

Aftermath
Two weeks after the draft, WWE held its pay-per-view event Crown Jewel. At the event, although the two had been drafted to separate brands, Raw draftee Seth Rollins defended the Universal Championship against SmackDown draftee "The Fiend" Bray Wyatt in a falls count anywhere match that could not be stopped for any reason; this was a rematch from Hell in a Cell, which was a Hell in a Cell match that ended by referee stoppage. The Fiend defeated Rollins to win the Universal Championship, and the title was subsequently transferred to the SmackDown brand, resulting in SmackDown having both the Universal and WWE Championships. This was quickly fixed, however. Also at Crown Jewel, SmackDown draftee Brock Lesnar retained the WWE Championship against Cain Velasquez, and following the match, he was attacked by Raw draftee Rey Mysterio, who was in Velasquez's corner. On the following night's episode of SmackDown, Lesnar's advocate Paul Heyman explained that since Lesnar and Mysterio were on two separate brands, they could not challenge each other. Heyman then declared that they were quitting SmackDown and transferring to Raw with the WWE Championship in order for Lesnar to seek revenge against Mysterio; a No Holds Barred match between the two was subsequently scheduled for Survivor Series.

Although the Wild Card Rule had ended with the 2019 draft, the theme of the next big pay-per-view, Survivor Series, has been brand supremacy since 2016, which would see the brands invading each other's shows in the build up to the event. Prior to the draft, WWE's developmental territory NXT was promoted to being WWE's third major brand and it was subsequently added to the 2019 Survivor Series brand competition. This in turn resulted in wrestlers from the three brands invading each other's shows to build matches for the event. In a media call for NXT TakeOver: WarGames, WWE COO and NXT head Triple H said that viewers would see definitive brand division following Survivor Series.

Following the draft, Drake Maverick announced that although he had been drafted to SmackDown, he would still be serving as the General Manager of the 205 Live brand; however, he stepped down from the position in April 2020 to return to in-ring competition. NXT General Manager William Regal was announced to take over the managerial duties of 205 Live in addition to NXT; Maverick was also moved to NXT in the process. Maverick, however, was then released from his WWE contract due to a cost-cutting measure but signed a new contract after competing in the interim NXT Cruiserweight Championship tournament. Just after the draft, Shorty Gable's ringname was shortened to Shorty G, while just before Survivor Series, Ali returned to using his previous ringname of Mustafa Ali. On December 8, WWE announced the releases of free agents The Ascension (Konnor and Viktor), who had been inactive for several months, Raw wrestler Sin Cara, and SmackDown wrestler Luke Harper. Cara had requested his release in November, while Harper had requested his back in April, but was denied at that time. Free agent Matt Hardy returned to Raw in late November, but was then quietly moved to SmackDown in early January for unexplained reasons before being moved back to Raw later that same month. Hardy then allowed his contract to expire in March due to creative differences. In April 2020, as a result of the COVID-19 pandemic, WWE released several talent due to budget cuts as a result of the pandemic. These included WWE Hall of Famer Kurt Angle, Rusev, the aforementioned Drake Maverick, Zack Ryder, Curt Hawkins, Karl Anderson, Luke Gallows, Heath Slater, Eric Young, Rowan, Sarah Logan, No Way Jose, Mike Chioda, Mike Kanellis, Maria Kanellis, EC3, Aiden English, Lio Rush, The Colóns (Primo and Epico), Curtis Axel, and Cain Velasquez, as well as many other behind-the-scenes employees.

Brand-to-Brand Invitation
In May 2020, WWE initiated the Brand-to-Brand Invitation, in which wrestlers are allowed to appear and wrestle on an opposing brand "four times a year", or once every quarter (this excludes an appearance to setup the match, as seen with the respective Raw and SmackDown tag team champions to set up their interbrand match for the September 14, 2020 episode of Raw). Although somewhat similar to the abolished Wild Card Rule, the rules of the Brand-to-Brand Invitation have been followed more strictly.

References

 

WWE Draft
WWE draft
Professional wrestling shows in Colorado
Professional wrestling shows in the Las Vegas Valley
October 2019 events in the United States
Events in Paradise, Nevada
Events in Denver